Wicked Nature is the sixth studio album by Australian alternative rock band The Vines. It was released on 2 September 2014. The double album is the band's first release under their own label Wicked Nature Music. The release marks a few milestones for The Vines, with frontman Craig Nicholls taking on the role of producer for the first time, as well as introducing a completely new rhythm section with drummer Lachlan West and bassist Tim John. Much of the funding for the album came from music funding website PledgeMusic.

Background
In late 2011, drummer Hamish Rosser and guitarist Ryan Griffiths left the band, as did bassist Brad Heald in early 2012. On 16 March 2012, Rosser spoke to music website Faster Louder about the departure, saying "Part of the reason for falling out with Craig is that I've always enjoyed playing in more than one band at any given time," and that "this was always an issue with Craig." He also mentioned that the band had "broken up", although "Craig will always write great music in the future and he may choose to carry on under The Vines' name."

On 20 August 2012, a new line-up, consisting of Nicholls, drummer Lachlan West and bassist Tim John, entered the studio to record the band's sixth album. Originally intended to be a single album, the first disc was recorded with producer Paul McKercher at Sydney's Rancom Studios. Whilst mixing the album, the trio worked on songs for what would become the second disc. In 2013, the band entered Sydney's Jungle Studios with Lachlan Mitchell and recorded ten tracks over a five-day period. 
 
On 2 July 2014, a new song, "Out the Loop" was made available on the band's SoundCloud page. On the same day, the band announced the PledgeMusic page for Wicked Nature and made 3 new songs available as a free download for those who pre-ordered the album. On 10 July, the video for lead single "Metal Zone" was released. The song has since reached #2 on Speciality Radio in the United States and the album debuted #29 on the ARIA Albums Charts in Australia.

Track listing

Personnel
 Craig Nicholls – vocals, guitar, co-producer of disc one, producer of disc two
 Tim John – bass 
 Lachlan West – drums
 Paul McKercher – co-producer of disc one
 Lachlan Mitchell – co-producer of disc two

Chart performance

References

The Vines (band) albums
2014 albums